The Latécoère 300 series of aircraft were a group of civil and military flying boats.  They were manufactured by French aircraft manufacturer Latécoère in the 1930s.  A single Latécoère 300 was built; it was flown for the first time in 1931 and sank the same year.  It was rebuilt and flown again in 1932, being named Croix du Sud ("Southern Cross").

Description 
The 300 was a monoplane of parasol wing construction.  It was powered by four engines, each of which produced 650 hp, arranged in two push-pull pairs. The 300 set an international aviation record for seaplanes on 31 December 1933, by flying  non-stop between Berre Lake near Marseille and Saint-Louis, Senegal.  The aircraft then entered service for Air France, transporting mail across the Atlantic Ocean from Dakar, Senegal to Natal, Brazil. 
It completed 23 missions before being lost at sea on December 7, 1936.  The pilot was the famous French aviator Jean Mermoz.

The civilian Laté 301, and military Laté 302 were based on the 300, with some design improvements.  A total of three aircraft of each type were built between 1935 and 1936.  The first of the 301s was lost, the remaining two were used in South Atlantic service until 1939.  In 1939 the last remaining 301 was converted to military service, joining the 302s in patrol duties in West Africa.

The aircraft supported a crew of four and included sleeping accommodations. Fuel and payload were stored inside the hull. The 302s and converted 301 were in service at the start of World War II, and continued in military service, flying patrols from Dakar until retired due to lack of spare parts, the last aircraft being grounded at the end of 1941.

Variants

Laté 300
Mailplane with Hispano-Suiza 12Nbr engines, one built.
Laté 301
Mailplane with Hispano-Suiza 12Nbr engines, three built.
Laté 302
Maritime reconnaissance aircraft with Hispano-Suiza 12Ydrs engines, three built.

Operators

Air France
French Navy

Specifications (Laté 302)

See also

References

Bibliography

External links

Latécoère 302 Specifications and photo
Seaplanes and flying boats of the French Naval Aviation

1930s French mailplanes
300
Flying boats
Four-engined push-pull aircraft
Parasol-wing aircraft
Aircraft first flown in 1931